Pherocera is a genus of stiletto flies in the family Therevidae. There are about 12 described species in Pherocera.

Species
These 12 species belong to the genus Pherocera:

 Pherocera albihalteralis Cole, 1923 i c g
 Pherocera bishopensis Irwin, 1983 i c g
 Pherocera boharti Irwin, 1983 i c g
 Pherocera boydi Irwin, 1983 i c g
 Pherocera flavipes Cole, 1923 i c g b
 Pherocera nigragena Irwin, 1983 i c g
 Pherocera nigripes Cole, 1923 i c g
 Pherocera rufoabdominalis Irwin, 1983 i c g
 Pherocera rupina Irwin, 1983 i c g
 Pherocera rupini Irwin, 1983 c g
 Pherocera signatifrons Cole, 1923 i c g
 Pherocera tomentamala Irwin, 1983 i c g

Data sources: i = ITIS, c = Catalogue of Life, g = GBIF, b = Bugguide.net

References

Further reading

 

Therevidae
Articles created by Qbugbot
Asiloidea genera